Private Orlando Emanuel Caruana (June 23, 1844 – September 14, 1917) was a Maltese-born American soldier who fought in the American Civil War. Caruana received the country's highest award for bravery during combat, the Medal of Honor, for his action during the Battle of New Bern in North Carolina on March 14, 1862 and the Battle of South Mountain in Maryland on September 14, 1862. He was honored with the award on November 14, 1890.

Biography

Caruana was born on June 23, 1844 in Valletta in the British Crown Colony of Malta. Claiming to be 20 years old, he enlisted in the U.S. Army from New York City in August 1861. He received the Medal of Honor for two actions. The first was on March 14, 1862 during the Battle of New Bern when he took the battle flag from the wounded color bearer, helping off the battlefield. The second was on September 14 that same year when he, along with three other men, volunteered to scout out the enemy's position in Maryland during the Battle of South Mountain. The other three men were killed but he managed to escape and rejoin his company. He was discharged from the 51st New York Infantry in September 1864.

Caruana died on September 14, 1917 and his remains are interred at the Mount Olivet Cemetery in Washington, D.C.

Medal of Honor citation

See also

List of American Civil War Medal of Honor recipients: A–F

References

External links

1844 births
1917 deaths
People of New York (state) in the American Civil War
Union Army officers
United States Army Medal of Honor recipients
American Civil War recipients of the Medal of Honor
People from Valletta
Maltese emigrants to the United States
Burials at Mount Olivet Cemetery (Washington, D.C.)
Maltese military personnel
Foreign-born Medal of Honor recipients